The 2015–16 Binghamton Bearcats men's basketball team  represented Binghamton University during the 2015–16 NCAA Division I men's basketball season. The Bearcats, led by fourth year head coach Tommy Dempsey, played their home games at the Binghamton University Events Center and were members of the America East Conference. They finished the season 8–22, 5–11 in America East play to finish in sixth place. They lost in the quarterfinals of the America East tournament to New Hampshire.

Roster

Schedule

|-
!colspan=9 style="background:#006B54; color:#FFFFFF;"| Exhibition

|-
!colspan=9 style="background:#006B54; color:#FFFFFF;"| Non-conference regular season

|-
!colspan=9 style="background:#006B54; color:#FFFFFF;"| America East regular season

|-
!colspan=9 style="background:#006B54; color:#FFFFFF;"| America East tournament

References

Binghamton Bearcats men's basketball seasons
Binghamton
Binghamton Bearcats men's basketball
Binghamton Bearcats men's basketball